Bayburt Province is a province of Turkey. Located in the Northeast Anatolia region of the country, the capital city is Bayburt, and with a population of 74,412 is the least-populous province in Turkey.

Geography
Bayburt is traversed by the northeasterly line of equal latitude and longitude.

Districts 

Bayburt province is divided into 3 districts (capital district in bold):
 Aydıntepe
 Bayburt
 Demirözü

Historical places 

The most important places in Bayburt Province are:
 Bayburt Tower
 Saruhan Tower
 Aydıntepe underground city
 Mausoleum of Dede Korkut
 Mausoleum of Şehit Osman
 Traditional Bayburt houses
 Ulu Mosque
 Pulur (Gökçedere) Ferahşat Bey Mosque
 Sünür (Çayıryolu) Kutlu Bey Mosque
 Yukarı Hınzeverek (Çatalçeşme) Mosque
 Bedesten (covered bazaar)
 Varzahan Armenian Church

Cities and towns 
Bayburt City 32,141 inh.
Aydıntepe City 2,663 inh.
Gökçedere Town 2,389 inh.
Demirözü City 2,137 inh.
Arpalı Town 1,934 inh.
Konursu Town 1,569 inh.

Climate
The climate is described as Humid Continental by the Köppen Climate System, abbreviated as Dfb.

See also
 1993 Bayburt Üzengili avalanche
 Arpalı Kasabası
 List of populated places in Bayburt Province

References

External links 

  Bayburt governor's official website
  Bayburt weather forecast information